The Bagobo babbler or Bagobo robin (Leonardina woodi) is a monotypic species of bird with its taxonomy undergoing numerous changes and is currently classified as Muscicapidae or an old world flycatcher. 
It is endemic to the Philippines only found in Mindanao. 

It habitat are in moist montane forests up to 2030 meters above sea level.  It is named after the Bagobo tribe.

Description 
EBird describes the bird as "A seldom-seen medium-sized ground. Rufous-brown above from the crown to the tail, gray below with a white throat and rufous from the lower belly to the base of the tail. Note the sturdy black bill, long legs, and large feet. Somewhat similar to Long-tailed bush warbler (which is endemic to Luzon) but lacks the pale brow and doesn’t cock its tail. Voice consists of very high-pitched whistles and some harsh rasping notes."

Not much else is known about this bird owing to its very secretive nature. 

Even the taxonomy of this bird is still unclear as it has been moved from different families - once placed in the Old World babbler family Timaliidae, later placed in Pellorneidae, but molecular studies show it belongs to the family Muscicapidae. It is possible that it belongs to a completely new family.

Habitat and Conservation Status 
It is found primarily in moist mid-montane and montane forests ranging from 500 - 2,000 m. It is low-lying bird never reaching heights 5 meters above the forest floor. 

IUCN has assessed this bird as a Least-concern species but there is a great lack of knowledge on any population statistics. The population was previously presumed to be threatened being declared Vulnerable up until 1996. However, recent fieldwork and research by BirdLife International has revealed this species to be more abundant than previous. This bird has a fairly limited range but it is fairly common in its habitat. It is not as threatened as other Philippine endemics as its montane habitat is less prone to deforestation as compared to lowland forests. Despite this, deforestation still occurs in these areas its just not to the extent of lowland forest.

References

 Collar, N. J. & Robson, C. 2007. Family Timaliidae (Babblers)  Pp. 70 – 291 in; del Hoyo, J., Elliott, A. & Christie, D.A. eds. Handbook of the Birds of the World, Vol. 12. Picathartes to Tits and Chickadees. Lynx Edicions, Barcelona.

 del Hoyo, J.; Elliott, A.; Christie, D. 2007. Handbook of the Birds of the World, vol. 12: Picathartes to Tits and Chickadees. Lynx Edicions, Barcelona, Spain.

Bagobo babbler
Endemic birds of the Philippines
Birds described in 1905
Taxonomy articles created by Polbot